Portline Transportes Marítimos Internacionais, SA., often simply called Portline is a Portuguese shipping company.  The company has diverse business activities, including dry bulk, containerised, and break-bulk cargo shipping, shipping agency, forwarding and logistics services, ship management and manning, ship brokerage and chartering, and a container depot service.

The company was originally state-owned and was privatized in 1991.

The company's general cargo services operate primarily in Europe, reaching to Cape Verde, The Canary Islands, West Africa, and Brazil.  Its bulk cargo service, which includes coal, ore, fertilizer and grain, serves markets in the Atlantic, Pacific and Indian Oceans.

Fleet

The Portline fleet consists of 16 ships.  Of these, 10 are bulk carriers and 6 are container ships.  The bulker section of the fleet has 2 Capesize ships, 2 Panamax ships, and 6 Supramax ships.

As of 2008, the fleet has ships ranging from 3 to 16 years of age with an average age of over 9 years.

The average capacity is just over  fleetwide.

Notes

References

External links
Company Profile at Det Norske Veritas
Portline at Flagspot.net
Portline at the Top 500 Database
Freight Rates at Coal Portal

Shipping companies of Portugal